"No Llores Por Mí" (English: Don't Cry for Me) is the fourth single released by Spanish singer-songwriter Enrique Iglesias from his eponymous debut studio album Enrique Iglesias (1995), It was released by Fonovisa on 6 May 1996 (see 1996 in music).

Song information
The track was written by Enrique Iglesias and co-written by Roberto Morales, produced by Rafael Pérez-Botija, and became Iglesias fourth consecutive chart topper in the U.S. In 1996, "No Llores Por Mí" was performed as a duet with Mexican singer Ana Bárbara for a televised music special aired in Mexico and the United States.

Only two albums achieved four number-one singles in the Billboard Hot Latin Tracks before: Amor Prohibido by Selena and Otro Día Más Sin Verte by Jon Secada. This record was broken by Iglesias with his following single "Trapecista". The singer won an ASCAP award for "No Llores Por Mí" in 1996.

Chart performance
The track debuted in the United States Billboard Hot Latin Tracks chart at number 28 on 3 August 1996, and rose to number 1 eight weeks later. The single spent twelve weeks in the top ten.

See also
List of number-one Billboard Hot Latin Tracks of 1996

References

1996 singles
1995 songs
Enrique Iglesias songs
Spanish-language songs
Songs written by Enrique Iglesias
Songs written by Roberto Morales
Fonovisa Records singles
1990s ballads
Pop ballads
Rock ballads